Bonanza: Under Attack is a 1995 made-for-television Western film. It is a sequel to the 1959–1973 television series Bonanza and television films Bonanza: The Next Generation (1988) and Bonanza: The Return (1993).  The film was directed by Mark Tinker and features noted character actors Ben Johnson, Jack Elam, and Richard Roundtree (reprising their roles from the 1993 film), as well as Leonard Nimoy and Dennis Farina.

The only leading actors from the original series who were still alive during production, Pernell Roberts and David Canary, do not appear in the film. However, the cast does include Michael Landon Jr. and Dirk Blocker, sons of the original series' actors who starred as Little Joe and Hoss Cartwright.

Nimoy and Farina portray real-life figures, outlaw Frank James (brother of Jesse James) and Pinkertons detective Charlie Siringo.

Partial cast
 Ben Johnson as Bronc Evans
 Michael Landon Jr. as Benjamin 'Benj' Cartwright
 Dirk Blocker as Fenster
 Jack Elam as 'Buckshot'
 Emily Warfield as Sara Cartwright
 Brian Leckner as Josh Cartwright
 Jeff Phillips as Adam 'A.C.' Cartwright Jr.
 Richard Roundtree as Jacob
 Dennis Farina as Charlie Siringo
 Leonard Nimoy as Frank James
 Ted Markland as Cole
 Gordon Jennison Noice as Jack 'Black Jack' (billed as J. Gordon Noice)
 Kenny Call as Mears

References

External links

 

Television sequel films
1990s Western (genre) television series
1995 television films
1995 films
NBC network original films
NBC Productions films
1995 Western (genre) films
Television series reunion films
Bonanza
1990s English-language films